The Apostolic Nunciature to Mongolia is an ecclesiastical office of the Catholic Church in Mongolia. It is a diplomatic post of the Holy See, whose representative is called the Apostolic Nuncio with the rank of an ambassador.

List of papal representatives to Mongolia 
Apostolic Nuncios
John Bulaitis (8 September 1992 – 25 March 1997)
Giovanni Battista Morandini (23 April 1997  – 6 March 2004)
Emil Paul Tscherrig (17 June 2004 – 26 January 2008)
Osvaldo Padilla (26 April 2008 – 15 September 2017)
Alfred Xuereb (26 February 2018 – present)

References

Mongolia
 
Holy See–Mongolia relations